Anand Teltumbde (born 15 July 1951) is an Indian scholar, writer, and civil rights activist who is a management professor at the Goa Institute of Management. He has written extensively about the caste system in India and has advocated for the rights of Dalits. He is also a longtime critic of Prime Minister Narendra Modi, and was imprisoned in 2020 along with other activists and intellectuals who were critical of the government. His arrest has been condemned by other academics and human rights organizations, and legal experts have said that the charges against him appear to be fabricated.

Biography
Teltumbde was born on 15 July 1951 in Rajur, a village in the Yavatmal district of Maharashtra state, to a family of Dalit farm labourers. He is the oldest among eight siblings. He is married to Rama Teltumbde who is a granddaughter of B. R. Ambedkar. He earned a mechanical engineering degree from Visvesvaraya National Institute of Technology in 1973, an MBA from the Indian Institute of Management Ahmedabad in 1982 and a PhD from the University of Mumbai in cybernetic modelling in 1993 while working as an executive at Bharat Petroleum. He was also awarded an honorary doctorate (D.Litt.) from the Karnataka State Open University.

Teltumbde was an Executive Director at Bharat Petroleum and managing director of Petronet India Limited before becoming an academic. He was a professor at the Indian Institute of Technology Kharagpur and later became a senior professor at the Goa Institute of Management. He contributes a column titled "Margin Speak" to Economic and Political Weekly, and has also contributed to Outlook, Tehelka, and Seminar. His 2018 book, Republic of Caste, is a collection of essays that assesses the position of Dalits, including the relationship between caste and class. Teltumbde advocates for a closer relationship between Marxism and the Ambedkarite movements in fighting for Dalit liberation, as well as reform of the reservation system.

On 29 August 2018, the police raided Teltumbde's home, accusing him of having a connection to the 2018 Bhima Koregaon violence and an alleged Maoist plot to assassinate Prime Minister Narendra Modi. Teltumbde denied the allegations and was granted temporary protection from arrest, but he was nevertheless arrested by the Pune police on 3 February 2019 and released later that day. After his release, Teltumbde accused the government of harassment and of attempting to criminalize dissent. In the course of the investigation, various others have been critical of the handling of the case, including Supreme Court Justice D. Y. Chandrachud who questioned the biased nature of the investigation by the Maharashtra Police, when hearing a plea on the same.

The Washington Post reported that Teltumbde was arrested as part of "a government crackdown on lawyers and activists" who are critics of Modi. Legal experts have said the charges against Teltumbde appear fabricated. More than 600 scholars and academics issued a joint statement in support of Teltumbde, condemning the government's actions as a "witch-hunt" and demanding an immediate halt to the actions against Teltumbde. In addition, over 150 organizations and intellectuals—including Noam Chomsky and Cornel West—signed a letter to United Nations secretary general António Guterres, describing the charges as "fabricated" and calling for the UN to intervene.

Teltumbde's mobile phone was hacked by Israeli spyware Pegasus through WhatsApp along with over a dozen other activists, lawyers, and journalists in India. Teltumbde had noticed his phone had been "acting up" and was later contacted by Citizen Lab in October 2019.

On 16 March 2020, the Supreme Court dismissed Teltumbde's plea for anticipatory bail under the Unlawful Activities (Prevention) Act, which makes bail difficult to obtain for accused individuals. The Court gave Teltumbde and Navlakha three weeks to surrender. On 8 April, a bench headed by Justice Arun Mishra ordered Teltumbde to surrender to the National Investigation Agency on 14 April. Historians such as Romila Thapar and organizations including Human Rights Watch condemned the arrest while Amnesty International India expressed disappointment in light of the UNHCHR guidelines to release all political prisoners due to the COVID-19 pandemic in India. He was again denied bail in July 2021. While imprisoned, Teltumbde has been allowed a weekly two-minute phone call with his wife.

Selected publications
 The Radical in Ambedkar (ed.) (Penguin Random House, New Delhi, 2018) 
 Republic of Caste: Thinking of Equality in the Era of Neoliberalism and Hindutva (Navayana, New Delhi, 2018) 
 Dalits: Past, Present and Future (Routledge, London and New York, 2016) 
 Mahad: The Making of the First Dalit Revolt (Aakar, New Delhi, 2015) 
 The Persistence of Caste (Zed Books, London, 2010) 
 Khairlanji: A Strange and Bitter Crop (Navayana, Delhi, 2008) 
 Annihilation of Caste (Ramai, Mumbai, 2005) 
 Hindutva and Dalits: Perspectives for Understanding Communal Praxis (ed.) (Samya, Kolkata, 2005) 
 'Ambedkar' in and for the Post-Ambedkar Dalit Movement (Sugawa, Pune, 1997)

References

External links
 

Living people
1950 births
Academic staff of Goa Institute of Management
Ambedkar family
Dalit writers
Dalit activists
Indian Buddhists
Indian scholars
Indian political writers
Indian civil rights activists
Writers from Maharashtra
People from Yavatmal district